Documentation Research and Training Centre (DRTC) is a research centre for library and information science and allied disciplines at the Indian Statistical Institute, Bangalore. The Centre was established in April 1962, under the auspices of Prof. S. R. Ranganathan (considered to be the father of modern library and information science in India) with the encouragement of Prof. P. C. Mahalanobis at the Indian Statistical Institute.

DRTC is India's only "proper" iSchool with a very strong research program.

DRTC runs a graduate program leading to the award of a 'Master of Science in Library and Information Science' (MS-LIS) from the Indian Statistical Institute  as well as serving as an academic and research center for Research Fellows registered for a PhD in Information Science. Research at DRTC generally focuses on the application of information technology to library and information science.

DRTC has a Ph.D. collaboration with the University of Trento, Italy.

2012 marked the Golden Jubilee of DRTC, which was celebrated with the 'International Conference on Trends in Knowledge and Information Dynamics' (ICTK-2012).

Courses

Master's Program
The DRTC offers a Master of Science in Library & Information Science (MS-LIS) with the primary objective of preparing the next generation information managers. This unique program offers an ideal blend of courses spanning library science, information technology, knowledge management and quantitative studies. The course also trains on cutting edge topics along with practical IT applications. On successful completion of this program, a student will be able to pursue an academic career or take up responsible positions in various government, public/ private sector undertakings and industrial organizations in their Library and Information centers and knowledge and data management teams. For those with an aptitude for higher studies and research, the M.S. Program provides a good foundation for PhD programs in India and abroad.

Research Program
The DRTC offers a Junior Research Fellowship program in Library & Information Science. This program helps the researchers to explore disciplines such as library science, information technology, knowledge management and quantitative studies. The researchers of the program will find excellent openings in the industry, especially the IT industry, R & D organizations and institutions of higher education & research.

Faculty
Devika P Madalli, Professor
M Krishnamurthy, Associate Professor and Head
Biswanath Dutta, Associate Professor

See also

 Documentation science

 Information science

 iSchool

References

External links
Documentation Research and Training Centre
ICTK2012,Bangalore, India

Library science education
Information schools
Libraries in Bangalore
Research institutes in Bangalore
1962 establishments in Mysore State
Indian Statistical Institute